Dame Sarah Ann Swift, GBE, RRC (22 November 1854, Kirton Skeldyke, Lincolnshire – 27 June 1937, Marylebone) was an English nurse and founder in 1916 of the Royal College of Nursing, thereby introducing Nurse registration.

Early life
Swift was born on the Blossom Hall Estate at Kirton Skeldyke in Holland, Lincolnshire, the daughter of a tenant farmer.

Previously, she had been Matron of Guy's Hospital (1901–09), then retired, but in the First World War she returned to this position for the British Red Cross Society and the Order of St John of Jerusalem in England.

Royal College of Nursing
With help from the Hon. Arthur Stanley (Chairman of the War Committee), Swift set up the College of Nursing. A letter was sent out to all the training hospitals outlining the idea pointing out that although there was disagreement on issues relating to registration there was a need to coordinated nursing and all trained nurses should unite in one democratic organisation with the power in the hands of the membership.

By 1918 there were 13,000 Members. They elected the first council and set up Centres (later to be called Branches). The College of Nursing later became the Royal College of Nursing (RCN) modelled on the Royal College of Physicians and surgeons. On 27 March 1916 the College of Nursing was registered. It became the Royal College of Nursing in 1947.

Recognition
In 1919 she was made Dame Grand Cross of the Order of the British Empire (GBE) for her services to nursing.

Legacy
A ward at St Thomas Hospital is named after her.

References

Sources

External links
 Official Royal College of Nursing website

1854 births
1937 deaths
English nurses
British nursing administrators
Dames Grand Cross of the Order of the British Empire
Members of the Royal Red Cross
People from Kirton, Lincolnshire
People from Marylebone
Presidents of the Royal College of Nursing